

Cuthwulf (or Cuthwolf; died  861) was a medieval Bishop of Hereford. He was consecrated between 836 and 839 and died between 857 and 866.

Citations

References

External links
 
 . Includes photos of the remaining fragments of the charter.

Bishops of Hereford
9th-century deaths
9th-century English bishops
Year of birth unknown